Paul Néaoutyine (born October 12, 1951 in Poindimié) is a New Caledonian politician.  A Kanak of the Saint-Michel tribe, he has been president of the North Province of New Caledonia since 1999.  He is a supporter of New Caledonian independence.

References

New Caledonia politicians
1951 births
Living people
Kanak people
People from North Province, New Caledonia